The Talladega National Forest is located in the U.S. state of Alabama and covers 392,567 acres (613.39 sq mi, or 1,588.66 km2) at the southern edge of the Appalachian Mountains.

Before it was bought by the federal government in the 1930s, the area that comprises the Talladega was extensively logged and represented some of the most abused, eroded wastelands in all of Alabama.  Pine forest regrowth now hosts a diverse eco-system.

The tiny 7,400 acre (30 km2) Cheaha Wilderness preserves a portion of this natural wealth on Talladega Mountain. The forest's second wilderness area, the Dugger Mountain Wilderness protects the area around Alabama's second-highest mountain peak.

Indigenous animals inhabiting this forest include coyote, black bear, white-tailed deer, two species of fox, bobwhite quail, two species of squirrel, turkey, rabbit, raccoon, and various waterfowl. The four forests are home to a number of threatened, endangered and sensitive species including the gopher tortoise, flattened musk turtle and the red-cockaded woodpecker.

This forest is headquartered in Montgomery, as are all four of Alabama's National Forests. The other National Forests in the state are Conecuh, Tuskegee, and William B. Bankhead. The Talladega National Forest is physically separated into two areas, and divided into three Ranger Districts:

 Oakmulgee District lies in the central part of the state, east of Tuscaloosa in Hale, Tuscaloosa, Bibb, Perry, Chilton, and Dallas Counties.  It consists of level to moderately sloping, broad ridges with stream terraces and broad floodplains. The ranger station is located in Brent. This district lies within the Southeastern mixed forests ecoregion and supports mixed forests of pine and oak.
 The Shoal Creek and Talladega Districts are located in the northeastern part of the state in Cherokee, Calhoun, Cleburne, Talladega and Clay Counties.  They consist of upland hills and low mountains with predominantly moderately steep slopes. They support Appalachian mixed mesophytic forests. The Shoal Creek ranger station is located in Heflin and the Talladega ranger station in its namesake city of Talladega.

The forest covers parts of eleven counties in Alabama. In descending order of forest land area they are Cleburne, Clay, Bibb, Talladega, Perry, Hale, Calhoun, Chilton, Tuscaloosa, Cherokee, and Dallas counties.

References

External links 
 Forest Service website on Talladega National Forest

National Forests of Alabama
National Forests of the Appalachians
Protected areas established in 1936
Protected areas of Hale County, Alabama
Protected areas of Tuscaloosa County, Alabama
Protected areas of Bibb County, Alabama
Protected areas of Perry County, Alabama
Protected areas of Chilton County, Alabama
Protected areas of Dallas County, Alabama
Protected areas of Cherokee County, Alabama
Protected areas of Calhoun County, Alabama
Protected areas of Cleburne County, Alabama
Protected areas of Talladega County, Alabama
Protected areas of Clay County, Alabama
1936 establishments in Alabama
Alabama placenames of Native American origin